This is a list of chapters for the manga series Major 2nd, written by Takuya Mitsuda and serialized in Weekly Shōnen Sunday. The first chapter appeared in a 2015 issue; Over one hundred and fifty chapters have been published as of September 15, 2018.



Volume list

Chapters not yet in tankōbon format
203. 
204. 
205. 
206. 
207. 
208. 
209. 
210. 
211. 
212. 
213. 
214. 
215. 
216. 
217. 
218.

References